Kudna (also known to the Crusaders as Kidna) was a Palestinian Arab village, located 25 kilometers northwest of Hebron.

History
Kudna was known to the Crusaders as Kidna. An archaeological site in Kudna contained remnants of a fort, the foundations of buildings, previously inhabited caves, and cisterns. About half a dozen khirbas lay in the vicinity.  The remains of a fortified building, possibly a hall-house, from the Crusader era is  still standing.

Ottoman period
In 1838, during the rule of the Ottoman empire, Edward Robinson   noted Kudna as a small Muslim village, located in the Gaza district.

In 1863 the French explorer Victor Guérin  found Kudna to have five hundred inhabitants.  It was  located on a hill whose summit was  rocky and whose sides were  covered with olive and fig trees interspersed with tobacco. On the highest point of the hill were the remains of an old castle, along sixty paces on fifty seven wide.  Guérin found the lower courses  being ancient, possibly Byzantine;  the upper layers more recent.

An Ottoman village list of about 1870 indicated 12 houses and a population of 40, though  the population count included men only.   In 1883, the PEF's Survey of Western Palestine  described Kudna as a small village situated on a low hill and  surrounded by olive trees. The walls of a Crusader Castle rose from the middle of the village.

In 1896 the population of   Kidna was estimated to be about 228 persons.

British Mandate era
In the  1922 census of Palestine conducted by the British Mandate authorities,  Kudna   had an entirely Muslim population of 281, increasing in the  1931 census  to  353 inhabitants.

In  the 1945 statistics  the population of Kudna  was   450, all  Muslims, who owned  15,744  dunams of land  according to an official land and population survey. 825   dunams were plantations and irrigable land,  6,505  for cereals, while 15 dunams were built-up (urban) land.

1948, and aftermath
During the 1948 Arab-Israeli War, the Israeli forces of the Giv'ati Brigade, commanded by Yigal Allon in Operation Yo'av assaulted the village on 22 October 1948. Though the village was defended by volunteers from the Arab Liberation Army, the Egyptian Muslim Brotherhood, and local militia men, it was overtaken by the Israeli forces and the village inhabitants fled. Benny Morris reports that Kudna was one of a number of villages, including Zikrin, Ra'na, Deir ad Dabbun and Ajjur, where most of the people fled before the arrival of the Givati Brigade; however those that did remain were expelled eastwards.

Following the war the area was incorporated into the State of Israel and kibbutz Beit Nir was established in 1955 to the west of the village site, on what had been village land.

The Palestinian historian Walid Khalidi described the village remaining structures in 1992: "The houses have been reduced to levelled debris hidden beneath an overgrowth of wild vegetation. One can see the stones that served as fences for home gardens. Cactuses and carob, fig, and olive trees grow on the site."

References

Bibliography

External links
Welcome To Kudna, District of Hebron
Kudna, Zochrot
Survey of Western Palestine, Map 20: IAA,   Wikimedia commons
Kudna, at Khalil Sakakini Cultural Center

Arab villages depopulated during the 1948 Arab–Israeli War
District of Hebron